The Ion Mincu University of Architecture and Urban Planning is a public university for architectural and urbanism studies in Bucharest, Romania. The university was named after the architect and engineer Ion Mincu.

References

External links

 Official site

Architecture schools in Romania
Universities in Bucharest
Educational institutions established in 1952
1952 establishments in Romania